Leopold Eric Kyanda (born 1 January 1970), is a Major General in the Uganda People's Defence Force (UPDF). He currently serves as the Joint Chief of Staff of the UPDF, effective 24 June 2021. He replaced Lieutenant General Joseph Musanyufu who was redeployed to the civil service.

Before that, he was the Chief of Staff of the Land Forces in the UPDF. replacing Major General Charles Angina, who was promoted to Lieutenant General and appointed Deputy Chief of Defence Forces of Uganda (DCDF).

Military career
Leo Kyanda was born on 1 January 1970. Ugandan press reports indicate that in 1994, he was an Aide de Camp to General Ivan Koreta, at that time, a Brigadier and was also his driver in that year. He later joined the then Presidential Guard Brigade (PGB), which today is part of the Special Forces Group (SFG). He rose in its ranks and eventually became the Commander of the PGB. Following that, he became the Commandant of the Chieftaincy of Military Intelligence (CMI). From there, he was assigned to the Ugandan Embassy in Washington, D.C., as the Military Attaché, serving in that capacity for two years. On his return to Uganda, he was appointed Chief of Personnel and Administration in the UPDF. From there, he was promoted to the rank of brigadier and assigned the post of Chief of Staff of Land Forces of Uganda. In December 2017, Kyanda completed a military course from the National Defence College in India.

In February 2019 he was promoted from the rank of Brigadier to that of Major General, as a part of a promotions exercise involving over 2,000 men and women of the UPDF.

Personal life 
He is the husband to Judy Rugasira Kyanda, the country manager for Knight Frank Uganda Ltd and a father of two daughters.

Awards 
Peal of Africa Lifetime Achievement Award (PALITA AWARD)-2015.

See also
 Ivan Koreta
 Muhoozi Kainerugaba
 Wilson Mbadi
 Hudson Mukasa

References

External links
Colonel Leopold Eric Kyanda Named Professional of the Year In Government Service
 Media Must Stop Witch-Hunting Colonel Kyanda – By Major Paddy Ankunda; 25 August 2008

1970 births
Living people
Ugandan military personnel
Ugandan generals
National Defence College, India alumni